The Château de la Roche is a ruined castle in the commune of Bellefosse in the Bas-Rhin département in Alsace, France. The site was recorded as fortified in 1180, but the present castle ruins are from a later period, most likely from 1284.

References

External links
 

Buildings and structures completed in the 13th century
Ruined castles in Bas-Rhin